Richard Masur (born November 20, 1948) is an American character actor who has appeared in more than 80 films. From 1995 to 1999, he served two terms as president of the Screen Actors Guild (SAG). He is best-known for playing David Kane on One Day at a Time (1975-1976), Nick Lobo on Rhoda (1974-1977), Stanley Uris in the miniseries It (1990), and Edward L. L. Moore on Younger (2016-2018).

Masur appeared in the 1976 made-for-TV movie Having Babies, playing the role of Adrienne Barbeau‘s husband.

Life and career
Masur was born in New York City to Jewish parents, a high school counselor mother, Claire Masur, and a pharmacist father, Jesse Masur. He has a sister Judith Masur. He attended P.S. 28, Walt Whitman Junior High School, and Roosevelt High School, Yonkers, New York. He is married to Eileen Henry.

Masur studied acting at the Yale School of Drama and appeared on stage before acting in movies and television shows during the 1970s. He appeared on an episode of The Waltons as well as in an episode of All in the Family in late 1974 and had recurring roles in Rhoda from 1974 to 1978; One Day at a Time from 1975 to 1976; Hot l Baltimore in 1975; and the pilot to an NBC sitcom, Bumpers, in 1977. In 1981, Masur played the role of a child molestor armed with a camera in the television film Fallen Angel. His next project was the 1982 horror/sci-fi movie The Thing, as the dog handler, Clark.

Masur played the father to Corey Haim's character in 1988's License to Drive and was part of the ensemble cast of the 1990 TV miniseries adaptation of Stephen King's It.

Masur played the role of a character modeled after Jewish American spy Jonathan Pollard in the film Les Patriotes (The Patriots) (1994), by French director Éric Rochant.

In January 2006, Masur began appearing as a recurring character on the soap opera All My Children. He has also appeared in guest spots on many TV shows, including M*A*S*H, The Mary Tyler Moore Show, Hawaii Five-O, Happy Days, Picket Fences, Matlock, Murphy Brown, Law & Order, Kevin (Probably) Saves the World, and Transparent.

Masur played the role of Martin Stone in the off-Broadway play Dust.

Filmography

All in the Family (1974) as George
 The Mary Tyler Moore Show (1974) as Bob Larson
The Waltons (1974) as Tom Povich
 Rhoda (1974–1977) as Nick Lobo
 Whiffs (1975) as Lockyer's Aide
 One Day at a Time (1975 TV series) (1975-1976) as David Kane
 M*A*S*H (1975) as 2nd LT. Digger
 Bittersweet Love (1976) as Alex
 Semi-Tough (1977) as Phillip Hooper
 Who'll Stop the Rain (1978) as Danskin
 Mr. Horn (1979, TV Movie) as Sheriff Ed Smalley
 Hanover Street (1979) as 2nd Lieut. Jerry Cimino
 Scavenger Hunt (1979) as Georgie Carruthers
 Heaven's Gate (1980) as Cully
 Fallen Angel (1981, TV Movie) as Howard Nichols
 I'm Dancing as Fast as I Can (1982) as Alan Newman
 The Thing (1982) as Clark
 Timerider: The Adventure of Lyle Swann (1982) as Claude Dorsett
 The Demon Murder Case (1983, TV Movie) as Anthony Marino
 Risky Business (1983) as Rutherford
 Nightmares (1983) as Steven Houston (segment "Night of the Rat")
 Adam (1983, TV Movie) as Jay Howell
 Under Fire (1983) as Hub Kittle
 Flight 90: Disaster on the Potomac (1984, TV Movie) as Roger Olian
 The Burning Bed (1984, TV Movie) as Aryon Greydanus
 The Falcon and the Snowman (1985) as Bartender (uncredited)
 The Mean Season (1985) as Bill Nolan
 My Science Project (1985) as Detective Isadore Nulty
 Head Office (1985) as Max Landsberger
 Heartburn (1986) as Arthur
 Mr. Boogedy (1986, TV Series) as Carleton Davis
 Adam: His Song Continues (1986, TV Movie) as Jay Howell
 When the Bough Breaks (1986, TV Movie) as Milo Sturgis
 Hard Lessons (1986, TV Movie) as Ben Proctor
 The Believers (1987) as Marty Wertheimer
 Rent-A-Cop (1987) as Roger Latrele
 Walker (1987) as Ephraim Squier
 Bride of Boogedy (1987, TV Series) as Carleton Davis
 Shoot to Kill (1988) as Norman
 Hiroshima Maiden (1988, TV Movie) as Jim Bennett
 License to Drive (1988) as Mr. Anderson
 Third Degree Burn (1989, TV Movie) as Clay Reynolds
 Far From Home (1989) as Duckett
 Molly and the Skywalkerz: Two Daddies? (1989, Direct-to-video) as Michael (voice)
 Flashback (1990) as Barry
 The Great Los Angeles Earthquake (1990, TV Movie) as Kevin Conrad
 It (1990, TV miniseries) as Stanley Uris
 Always Remember I Love You  (1990, TV movie) as Earl Monroe
 Going Under (1991) as Defense Contractor
 My Girl (1991) as Phil Sultenfuss
 The Story Lady (1991, TV Movie) as Norm Denton
 Encino Man (1992) as Mr. Morgan
 Blood In Blood Out (aka Bound by Honor) (1993) as Prison Librarian (uncredited)
 The Man Without a Face (1993) as Prof. Carl Hartley
 And the Band Played On (1993, TV Movie) as William W. Darrow, Ph.D.
 Six Degrees of Separation (1993) as Dr. Fine
 My Girl 2 (1994) as Phil Sultenfuss
 Les Patriotes (The Patriots) (1994) as Jeremy Pelman
 Forget Paris (1995) as Craig
 The Face on the Milk Carton  (1995, TV Movie) as Jonathan Sands
 Multiplicity (1996) as Del King
 Fire Down Below (1997) as Phil Pratt
 Play It to the Bone (1999) as Artie
 61* (2001, TV Movie) as Milt Kahn
 Palindromes (2004) as Steve Victor
 Lovely By Surprise (2007) as Dave
 Vote and Die: Liszt for President (2008) as Rease Cunningham
 Tumbledown (2015) as Bruce
 The Good Wife (2015–16, TV Series) as Geoffrey Solomon
 Transparent (2015–16, TV Series) as Buzzy Rackless
 Orange Is the New Black (2015–16, TV series) as Bill Montgomery
 Don't Think Twice (2016) as Lou
 Younger (2016–18, TV Series) as Edward L.L. Moore / Edward LL Moore / Edward
 Lonely Boys (2016) as Irving
 Kaleidoscope (2023) as Dr. Wagner
 The Equalizer (2023) as Rabbi Altman

References

External links
 
 
 
 
 Richard Masur(Aveleyman)

20th-century American male actors
21st-century American male actors
Male actors from New York City
American male film actors
American trade union leaders
American male soap opera actors
American male television actors
American television directors
Jewish American male actors
Living people
Presidents of the Screen Actors Guild
Yale School of Drama alumni
Activists from New York (state)
21st-century American Jews
1948 births